Long Key is an island in the middle Florida Keys. Long Key was called Cayo Víbora (Rattlesnake Key) by early Spanish explorers, a reference to the shape of the island, which resembles a snake with its jaws open, rather than to its denizens. The city of Layton is located on Long Key. The  state park (3.9 km²) was dedicated October 1, 1969.

U.S. 1 (or the Overseas Highway) crosses the key at approximately mile markers 65.5--71, between Fiesta Key and Conch Key. It is the home of Long Key State Park, a favorite of campers and nature lovers, the camp sites are on the beach but the proximity of US1 makes it noisy. It is smaller and less developed than the neighboring incorporated village of Islamorada to the northeast and city of Marathon to the southwest.

History 
It was visited by C.W. Pierce in his boat, Bonton (1885). He stopped at the lower end of the key where there was a house with a cistern and replenished his water supply.

The key was a depot site during the railroad years, and it was also the site of the well known Long Key Fishing Camp.

Education
It is in the Monroe County School District. It is zoned to Plantation Key Elementary School (K-8) in Plantation Key.

References

External links 
Keys History
Long Key State Park site

Islands of the Florida Keys
Islands of Monroe County, Florida
Beaches of Monroe County, Florida
Beaches of Florida
Islands of Florida